"Tommy's Halloween Fairy Tale" is the second solo EP by Tomoko Kawase, released October 21, 2015 through Warner Music Japan. The EP features songs from both the Tommy heavenly6 and Tommy february6 personas. The EP peaked at #28 on the Oricon Albums Chart and stayed on the chart for two weeks.

Track listing
All lyrics written by Tomoko Kawase, except "The Sparkling Candy Man" by Kawase and James De Barrado, all music written by Shunsaku Okuda.

References

2015 EPs
Japanese-language EPs